Sherwood MacDonald (1880–1968) was an American film director of the silent era. He worked for studios such as Mutual Film, Pathe Exchange and FBO Pictures. He made several films with the child actress Gloria Joy. He directed the 1915 serial The Red Circle.

Selected filmography
 The Red Circle (1915)
 The Sultana (1916)
 The Matrimonial Martyr (1916)
 Sold at Auction (1917)
 The Wildcat (1917)
 Bab the Fixer (1917)
 Sunny Jane (1917)
 No Children Wanted (1918)
 Muggsy (1919)
 Cold Steel (1921)
 The Girl from Rocky Point (1922)

References

Bibliography
 Slide, Anthony. The New Historical Dictionary of the American Film Industry. Routledge, 2014.

External links

1880 births
1968 deaths
American film directors
Film directors from New York City